Manuel Cargaleiro, (born 1927 in Vila Velha de Ródão), is a Portuguese artist who creates ceramic and painting. Cargaleiro learned as an autodidact. He produced earthenware squares, the Portuguese Azulejo, an art that still has its importance in Portugal, and had been brought by the Arabs to the Iberian peninsula.

He settled in France in 1957, a country which became his home. He was influenced by artists from the École de Paris, such as Delaunay, Ernst, Vasarely and Klee. His compositions are based on geometrical modules and primary colors, suggesting movement in space.

Manuel Cargaleiro has received awards and decorations in Portugal, France and Italy. In 1995 the artist created frescos for the subway station Champs-Elysées Clémenceau in Paris. He also worked for the Museum Manuel Cargaleiro in Vietri sul Mare. He received recognition and honor both in France and in his native Portugal.

In 2004, the inauguration of the Foundation-Museum Manuel Cargaleiro, Museum Manuel Cargaleiro took place, to which the artist made donations of works. This place is an important center for the art of ceramics.

Cargaleiro lives and works in Paris.

See also
Azulejo

References

1927 births
Living people
Portuguese painters
Portuguese male painters
People from Vila Velha de Ródão
Commanders of the Order of Saint James of the Sword
Grand Crosses of the Order of Merit (Portugal)
Grand Crosses of the Order of Prince Henry
Portuguese emigrants to France